The Magician Out of Manchuria is a fantasy novel by Charles G. Finney.  It was first published by itself in 1976 by Panther Books and later in a limited edition of 600 copies from Donald M. Grant, Publisher, Inc. which were signed and numbered.  The novel was previously included in an expanded edition of the Finney's book The Unholy City in 1968.

Plot introduction
The novel concerns the adventures of a hero who encounters a queen with remarkable talents.

References

1976 American novels
American fantasy novels
Novels set in China
Panther Books books